Ellerslie Racecourse is the main racecourse in Auckland, New Zealand, for thoroughbred racehorses. It is an undulating, grass circuit in the suburb of Ellerslie, with a circumference of just under 1,900 metres.  Racing is conducted in a clockwise (right-handed) direction.

History

Horses have raced at Ellerslie since 1857 when Robert Graham hosted a race meeting on his property, on the site which is now Ellerslie Racecourse. The Auckland Racing club then purchased thirty-six hectares of land from Graham in 1872 on which the course is situated.

The first race meeting of the Auckland Racing Club was held at Ellerslie on 25 May 1874. At this time the racecourse was a considerable distance outside the city and it took Aucklanders up to several hours to get to the course by carriage.

A "platform" station, Ellerslie Racecourse Platform was opened in January 1874. Many went by train, although with the demand created by the event, as late as in 1910 they often had to travel in open cattle trucks because there were not enough normal coaches available for the demand of the extra services.

A publication compiled by E.G. Sutherland, held in the Sir George Grey Special Collections, makes note of the importance of the aesthetic appeal of Ellerslie:

"It seems worthy of mention that by making Ellerslie attractive the Auckland Racing Club has added to the popularity of the sport. Ellerslie’s attractive outlook has been partly responsible for bringing thousands of visiting racing patrons within its borders to witness the best class of thoroughbreds in action. It’s well laid out floral beds, ponds and large variety of choice trees and palms have drawn kudos from Royalty, Governors, Viceroys, tourists and visitors from all parts of the world."

Ellerslie was the location of the first automatic totalisator, designed by George Julius and installed in 1913.. Queen Elizabeth II visited the racecourse during the royal visit to New Zealand in 1953/54.

During World War Two the Stands were used as Hospital Wards for the American Forces serving in the Pacific.
Dr McGregor-Grant, who the Steeplechase is named after, was the head Doctor.

During the 20th century, Ellerslie Racecourse provided plants for Kingseat Hospital.

Champion racehorses to have raced at Ellerslie include Kindergarten, Balmerino, Bonecrusher, Uncle Remus, Japan Cup winner Horlicks, Il Tempo, Mr Tiz, Sunline (who was buried at the racecourse in 2009) and Jimmy Choux.

Ellerslie is home to two of New Zealand's major racing carnivals - the Summer Carnival and Auckland Cup Week. The Summer Carnival is run in the Christmas-New Year period with Boxing Day and New Year's Day formerly being home to the New Zealand Derby and Auckland Cup respectively, but these were moved to the new Auckland Cup Week in March 2006.

Steeplechasing
Steeplechasing at Ellerslie uses the well-known "hill." The jumping track leaves the course proper just before the 1000 metre mark at the end of the back straight and rises approximately 16 metres to the top of the hill, where there are two steeplechase fences 100 metres apart.  There is another at the foot of the hill where the steeplechase track rejoins the course proper just after the 600-metre mark.  The total length of this section of the track is approximately 750 metres.  It is not used for flat racing. The major steeplechase at Ellerslie, the Great Northern Steeplechase, requires the horses to climb this hill 3 times in the 6400m event.

Races
The following is a list of Group races which are run at Ellerslie Racecourse.

Other races of note in the past include:

 Great Northern Foal Stakes, currently a listed race known as the Auckland Futurity Stakes.
 DB Draught Classic.
 Great Northern St. Leger.

See also

 Thoroughbred racing in New Zealand
 Trentham Racecourse

References 

Sports venues in Auckland
Horse racing venues in New Zealand
Cross country running venues
Ōrākei Local Board Area